Pecorino Romano is a hard, salty Italian cheese, often used for grating, made with sheep's milk. The name "pecorino" simply means "ovine" or "of sheep" in Italian; the name of the cheese, although protected, is a simple description rather than a brand: "[formaggio] pecorino romano" is simply "sheep's [cheese] of Rome".

Even though this variety of cheese originated in Lazio, as the name also indicates, most of its actual production has moved to the island of Sardinia. "Pecorino romano" is an Italian product with name recognized and protected by the laws of the European Community.

Pecorino Romano was a staple in the diet for the legionaries of ancient Rome. Today, it is still made according to the original recipe and is one of Italy's oldest cheeses. On the first of May, Roman families traditionally eat pecorino with fresh fava beans during a daily excursion in the Roman Campagna. It is mostly used in Central and Southern Italy.

Overview

A cheese variety of what might be considered the earliest form of today's Pecorino Romano was first created in the countryside around Rome, whose production methods are described by Latin authors such as Varro and Pliny the Elder about 2,000 years ago. Its long-term storage capacity led to it being used for feeding Roman legions. A daily ration of about 27 grams (1 Roman ounce) was allotted to the legionaries in addition to bread and farro soup. The cheese gave back strength and vigour since it was a high-energy food that was easy to digest. It was produced only in the region surrounding Rome (Lazio) until the end of the 19th century. In 1884 the Roman city council prohibited salting the cheese in the grocers' shops in Rome, but this could not prevent the establishment of salting premises and cheesemaking premises on the outskirts of Rome or elsewhere in Lazio. Pressure to move production out of Lazio was in fact caused by a great increase in demand for the cheese, which the Lazio flocks could not satisfy. This led several producers to expand their production in Sardinia. Sardinia, which had been experiencing a severe reduction of its forest cover as a direct result of human activity, provided the Roman entrepreneurs with a kind of soil that was ideal for the promotion of monoculture farming.

It is produced exclusively from the milk of sheep raised on the plains of Lazio and in Sardinia. Nowadays, most of the cheese is produced on the island, especially in Macomer. Pecorino Romano must be made with lamb rennet from animals raised in the same production area, and is consequently not suitable for vegetarians.

Pecorino Romano is often used on pasta dishes, like the better-known Parmigiano Reggiano. Its distinctive aromatic and pleasantly sharp, very salty flavour led to it being  preferred for some Italian pasta dishes with highly flavoured sauces, especially those of Roman and Lazio origin, such as bucatini all'amatriciana, spaghetti alla carbonara, pasta alla gricia, and spaghetti cacio e pepe (of which it is a main ingredient). The sharpness depends on the period of maturation, which varies from five months for a table cheese to eight months or longer for a grating cheese. Most pecorino cheeses are classified as grana and are granular, hard and sharply flavored.

Other types of pecorino
There are other regional types of pecorino cheese. Pecorino Toscano (from Tuscany) and Pecorino Sardo (from Sardinia) are not particularly salty, and are generally eaten as they are, rather than grated and used as a cooking ingredient. In the United States "Romano cheese" is sometimes sold; it is not based on real pecorino Romano, but is a milder cheese made with cow's milk.

See also
 Sardinian sheep
 List of ancient dishes and foods
 List of Italian PDO cheeses
 List of sheep milk cheeses

References

External links
  Production requirements
  Consorzio per la Tutela del Formaggio Pecorino Romano (Consortium for the Protection of Pecorino Romano Cheese)

Italian cheeses
Sheep's-milk cheeses
Italian products with protected designation of origin
Cuisine of Sardinia
Cuisine of Lazio
Cheeses with designation of origin protected in the European Union
Sardinian cheeses
Roman cuisine

de:Pecorino (Käse)#Pecorino romano, DOP